Heliothis hoarei is a species of moth of the family Noctuidae. It is endemic to the Northern Territory and Queensland.

External links
 Australian Faunal Directory

Heliothis
Moths described in 1999